The Fisher School of Accounting is the accounting school at the University of Florida.

History

In 1977, the School of Accounting was established by the Florida Board of Regents as a separate school within the Warrington College of Business, and was endowed in 1985 by Frederick Fisher.  Dr. John Simmons was the founding Director of the Fisher School.  The School first conferred degrees in accounting in December 1978 although accounting has existed as a program in some form since 1928.

Rankings
According to the 2020 US News Rankings, The Fisher School of Accounting's undergraduate accounting program was ranked 11th overall nationally amongst private and public universities and the graduate program was ranked 17th overall. The School publishes the Journal of Accounting Literature and is home to the International Accounting and Auditing Center. Fisher School of Accounting graduates' pass rate on the Certified Public Accountant (CPA) exam has been traditionally nearly twice as high as the national average.

In 2017, first-time candidates from The Fisher School held an overall passing rate of 80% on all four parts of the CPA exam, ranking them 8th in the nation out of 264 peer institutions for overall passing rate.

Program

The undergraduate Fisher School of Accounting offers a traditional Bachelor of Science in Accounting.

The graduate school offers a Master of Accounting with concentrations in Auditing and Taxation for students seeking careers as Certified Public Accountants. The completion of the master's degree fulfills the State of Florida's requirements to take the CPA exam. The school offers two combined-degree programs: one leads to the joint awarding of a Bachelor of Science in Accounting and a Master of Accounting, whereas the second partners with the Levin College of Law and offers a Juris Doctor (J.D.) degree along with a Master of Accounting.

Additionally, the Fisher School offers a Ph.D program in Accounting to prepare students for a career at academic research institutions. Graduates typically place at a Research I university. The most recent placements include Ohio State University, University of Illinois, University of Connecticut, Arizona State University, and The University of Kentucky, with international placements including The Chinese University of Hong Kong, Hanyang University, and The University of Waterloo.

Students
The Fisher School of Accounting has approximately 432 undergraduate and 197 graduate students as of Fall 2018.

Student Outcomes

The majority of undergraduate students graduating from The Fisher School choose to pursue a graduate accounting degree in lieu of working full-time. The Master of Accounting program has boasted a near perfect employment record of 97.5% to 100% of its domestic students since the university began tracking employment outcomes in 2015, with 73% to 80% of the graduating cohort accepting offers from Big Four accounting firms each year. The most common places of employment are based in the South Florida region and the cities of Atlanta, New York City, Tampa, Orlando, and Jacksonville.

Faculty
Gary McGill is the current and longest serving Director of the Fisher School of Accounting. Mr. John Laibson is the Associate Director. Other current faculty include Robert Knechel, the Fisher Eminent Scholar, Stephen Asare, Jenny Tucker, Jesse Boyles, Marcus Kirk, Paul Madsen, Luke Watson, Lisa Hinson, Michael Ricci, Bobby Carnes, Jill Goslinga, Chris Falk, Sonia Singh, Joost Impink, Michael Schadewald, and Ruby Lee. Emeritus faculty include John Simmons, Joel Demski, Doug Snowball, Rashad Abdel-Khalik, Bipin Ajinkya, Chuck McDonald, Dominique DeSantiago, and Debbie Garvin.

References

External links
Official Website
Current Faculty
Rankings
CPA Exam Performance
International Accounting and Auditing Center
Recent Research

Accounting schools in the United States
Colleges of the University of Florida
Educational institutions established in 1977
1977 establishments in Florida